Jane Sanderson (born 17 August 1962) is a British novelist.

Sanderson was educated at Kirk Balk School near Barnsley, and at Leicester University. She was a newspaper journalist before joining the BBC, where she was a producer on The World At One, PM, and Woman's Hour.

In 2011, Sanderson's debut novel, Netherwood, was published by Little, Brown. Set in a Yorkshire pit village around the turn of the 20th century, and based in part on Sanderson's own family history, it has been widely acclaimed and is the first in a series. The sequel, Ravenscliffe, was published in September 2012, and the third book in the series, Eden Falls, in September 2013. Sanderson's fourth book, This Much Is True, is a contemporary family drama and not part of the Netherwood series. It was published in May 2017 by Orion. Her fifth book, Mix Tape, was published by Transworld in January 2020. Transworld reportedly paid a six-figure sum for the UK and Commonwealth rights, and Mix Tape has also been bought by publishers in Germany, France, Italy, Poland, the Czech Republic and Slovakia. Anne Cater in the Daily Express called it "beautifully written and a joy to read". Sanderson's most recent novel, Waiting For Sunshine, was published by Transworld in July 2022.

Sanderson has been married since 1993 to the journalist and author Brian Viner. They have three children and live in Herefordshire, England. They also have a houseboat in London.

References

External links 

1962 births
Living people
English women novelists
21st-century British novelists
People from Barnsley
Alumni of the University of Leicester
21st-century English women writers